Porchetta is a savory, fatty, and moist boneless pork roast of Italian culinary tradition. The carcass is deboned and spitted or roasted traditionally over wood for at least eight hours, fat and skin still on. In some traditions, porchetta is stuffed with liver and wild fennel, though many versions do not involve stuffing. Porchetta is usually heavily salted and can be stuffed with garlic, rosemary, fennel, or other herbs, often wild. Porchetta has been selected by the Italian Ministry of Agricultural, Food and Forestry Policy as a prodotto agroalimentare tradizionale ("traditional agricultural-food product"), one of a list of traditional Italian foods held to have cultural relevance.

In Italy

Although popular in the whole country, porchetta originated in central Italy, with Ariccia (in the Province of Rome) being the town most closely associated with it. Elsewhere, it is considered a celebratory dish. Across Italy, porchetta is usually sold by pitchmen with their typically white-painted vans, especially during public displays or holidays, and it can be served in a panino. It's a common street food in Rome, and Lazio served as a filling for pizza bianca. It is also eaten as a meat dish in many households or as part of a picnic.

Porchetta is one of the two iconic culinary products of the Lazio region, the other being sheep cheese pecorino romano. Porchetta is also common in Abruzzo. Porchetta abruzzese is generally slow roasted with rosemary, garlic, and pepper. Porchetta from Umbria is stuffed with the pig's chopped entrails mixed with lard, garlic, salt and plenty of pepper and wild fennel.

Porchetta trevigiana (from Treviso) was developed in 1919. In it, a pig is killed at one year old, and its meat is stuffed with salt, pepper, wild fennel, garlic and white wine. The porchetta is today a popular dish in Venetian cuisine.

The dish is also a staple of Sardinian cuisine. There it is known as "porceddu" and is roasted over juniper and myrtle wood fires.

In North America

Porchetta was introduced to the United States by Italian immigrants of the early 20th century, especially immigrants from Abruzzo, and is sometimes referred to as "Italian pulled pork," "roast pork," or "Italian roast pork." It is, in many places, served on a sandwich with greens (rapini or spinach) and provolone cheese.

In Philadelphia and the surrounding area, the dish is usually referred to as simply "roast pork," "roast pork sandwich," "Italian roast pork," "roast pork Italian," "roasted pork," or "porchetta." Philadelphia cuisine is noted for its sandwich form of porchetta, usually served on an Italian roll and often with broccoli rabe and most traditionally with locally made sharp provolone. "Roast pork" is a staple of Philadelphia Italian-American and South Philadelphia cuisine, with restaurants such as DiNic's Roast Pork in the Reading Terminal Market and John's Roast Pork, Esposito's Porchetta, and Tony Luke's in South Philadelphia being well known for their porchetta or "roast pork" sandwiches.

Bridgeport, Connecticut, has a Saturday afternoon lunch tradition of porchetta sandwiches served at community restaurants and taverns that dates back to the first wave of Italian immigration in the early 20th century.  The dish is served with pepperoncini.

The porchetta and roast beef sandwich traditions are celebrated in the form of an annual bus tour every first Saturday in March in Bridgeport, Connecticut, organized by The Porchetta Project.

Metro West Massachusetts has a fierce following of porchettas. Local organizations often hold Porchetta Dinners as very popular and well-attended fundraisers. Many local shops make a roast for purchase, cooked or uncooked. Notable areas are Milford and Framingham, Massachusetts, as they both have large Italian populations. The spices used vary greatly within this area; some will go full bore with garlic, black pepper, salt, fennel, rosemary, and sage, and others will use only garlic, salt, pepper, and fennel. The stem of the fennel plant is often substituted for the fennel seed. These local roasts are made from the Boston butt or shoulder of the pig.

Porchetta is also very popular in Northern Ontario (notably Sudbury and Sault Ste. Marie) and Southern Ontario (in areas such as Hamilton and St. Catharines), and the term "porchetta" is widely used by Italian-Canadians, instead of simply "roast pork".  Italian settlers in Sudbury passed their love for porchetta to their children and friends in this region. Old family secrets of spicing, rolling and roasting are passed on, extending commercially into butcher shops and in the form of fast-food sandwiches offered in various locally owned shops. "Porketta Bingo", a variation on the traditional Canadian meat draw, is a popular Saturday afternoon activity in Sudbury. Game winners receive one pound of porchetta and a sourdough bun. There are usually between four and seven rounds of six games each, depending on the establishment. Proceeds of Porketta Bingo usually go to a local charity or are donated to local hockey associations.

In the Upper Midwest porchetta, more often spelled "porketta", was also introduced by Italian immigrants to the iron ranges of Minnesota and Michigan. Porketta remains a popular local dish in towns such as Hibbing, Minnesota with distributors such as Fraboni Sausage.

See also
 List of Italian dishes
 List of stuffed dishes

References

Cuisine of Lazio
Cuisine of Abruzzo
Cuisine of Philadelphia
Pork dishes
Barbecue
Sandwiches
Stuffed dishes
Cuisine of Umbria
Italian meat dishes